Richard More (died 1635) of Cuddington, Buckinghamshire, was an English politician.

Education
More was educated at New Inn and Middle Temple 1586.

Career
He was a Member (MP) of the Parliament of England for Aylesbury in 1601.

References

16th-century births
1635 deaths
People from Buckinghamshire
Members of the Middle Temple
English MPs 1601